Daftari is a surname. Notable people with the surname include:

Ahmad Matin-Daftari (1897–1971), Iranian politician
Lisa Daftari, American/Iranian journalist
Maua Abeid Daftari (born 1953), Government minister of Tanzania